Attorney General Armstrong may refer to:

David L. Armstrong (1941–2017), Attorney General of Kentucky
William Nevins Armstrong (1835–1905), Attorney General of the Kingdom of Hawaii

See also
General Armstrong (disambiguation)